Rush Job is a 1951 British television film starring Stanley Baker, Julien Mitchell, Rachel Gurney, and Iris Williams.

External links
Rush Job at IMDb

British television films